Carrie Finlay is a Canadian actress. She began her professional career as an actress, first appearing as a voice  actress in the Canadian-French-Chinese animated television series Mona the Vampire in 1999. She has had several live-action roles, appearing in The Worst Witch, Gambling and Addiction, The Gazette, The Reagans, The Score and Timeline. She has also appeared onstage in several productions.

Finlay attended the Faculty of Law at McGill University.

Filmography

Animation
 Arthur
 The Bellflower Bunnies
 Billy and Buddy
 The Boy
 Bratz
 Caillou
 Creepschool
 Daft Planet
 Dragon Hunters
 For Better or For Worse
 Kid Paddle
 The Kids from Room 402
 Lola and Virginia
 Marsupilami
 Martin Morning
 Momo
 Mona the Vampire - Lily Duncan (Princess Giant)
 Monster Allergy
 Monster Buster Club
 My Goldfish is Evil
 Nunavut
 Pirate Family
 PopPixie
 Potatoes and Dragons
 Prudence Gumshoe
 Ripley's Believe It or Not
 Sagwa, the Chinese Siamese Cat
 Shaolin Kids
 Simon in the Land of Chalk Drawings
 Spaced Out
 Tripping the Rift
 Winx Club
 Tupu
 Upstairs, Downstairs Bears
 What's with Andy?
 Wombat City
 Woofy
 X-DuckX
 Zoé Kezako

Film and television
 Gambling and Addiction
 The Gazette
 The Reagans
 The Score
 Timeline
 The Worst Witch

References

External links

Living people
Canadian child actresses
Canadian voice actresses
Year of birth missing (living people)